Minska is a station on Kyiv Metro's Obolonsko–Teremkivska Line. The station was opened on 6 November 1982 in the Obolonskyi Raion of Kyiv. It was designed by I.L. Maslenkov, T.A. Tselikovska, and F.M. Zaremba. The station takes its name from the Minskyi Raion (now Obolonskyi Raion) in which it is situated.

The station is located shallow underground and is the first Kyiv Metro station with a vaulted roof without column support. Along the tracks, on the ceiling, and above the entrance to the station's hall is a colorful motif, depicting flowers. The station is accessible by passenger tunnels; one leading to the Obolon'skyi Prospect, and the other — to Marshala Tymoshenko Street.

Voters chose to rename the station Varshavska - after Warsaw; another choice was Vyshhorodska - in a poll taken during the 2022 Russian invasion of Ukraine.

References

External links
 Kyivsky Metropoliten — Station description and photographs 
 Metropoliten.kiev.ua — Station description and photographs 

Kyiv Metro stations
Railway stations opened in 1982
1982 establishments in the Soviet Union
1982 establishments in Ukraine